is a Japanese singer and model. She is a member of the Japanese idol girl group Hinatazaka46 and an exclusive model for the women's magazine Bis.

Career

Music 
On August 13, 2017, Kanemura passed the auditions for new members of Keyakizaka46's subgroup Hiragana Keyakizaka46 (now Hinatazaka46) and became one of the second generation members of the group.

Kanemura became a title song center (lead performer) for the first time for Hinatazaka46's sixth single "Tteka", released on October 27, 2021.

Aside from singing, Kanemura also plays the saxophone and drums and has played both on Hinatazaka46's television shows.

Kanemura launched her official Instagram account on her twentieth birthday.

Modeling 
On October 1, 2020, Kanemura became an exclusive model for the Japanese fashion magazine Bis. She has since walked the runways of Tokyo Girls Collection (2021 Autumn/Winter, 2022 Spring/Summer) and GirlsAward (2022 Spring/Summer).

Kanemura's first photobook, titled , was released on December 20, 2022, published by Kobunsha (the publisher of Bis). The photography took place from autumn 2021 to summer 2022 in the prefectures of Hokkaido, Kyoto, Wakayama, and Kagoshima. The book sold 73,000 copies in its first week and placed first on the Oricon Weekly Book Ranking.

Other ventures 

The band's drummer, comedian Kazutoyo Koyabu, was the host of Hinatazaka46's television show Hinabingo!

Discography 
Kanemura has participated in all Hinatazaka46 title songs, as well as the all-member and second generation member songs by Hiragana Keyakizaka46 since "Kaze ni Fukarete mo" (2017) and by Hinatazaka46. She was the center (lead performer) for the title song "Tteka" (2021) and has been on the front row of the choreography of all title songs since "Sonna Koto Nai yo" (2020). Other prominent appearances include:

 "Dash & Rush" ("Do Re Mi Sol La Si Do" B-side, 2019), center
 "Cage" ("Do Re Mi Sol La Si Do" B-side, 2019), with Mei Higashimura, Hina Kawata, and Akari Nibu
 "See Through" (Hinatazaka, 2020), duet with Nao Kosaka (NaoMiku)
 "Omoigakenai Double Rainbow" and "Additional Time" ("Tteka" B-sides, 2021), center
 "Akubi Letter" ("Tteka" B-side, 2021), center, with Color Chart
 "Mou Konna ni Suki ni Narenai" ("Boku Nanka" B-side, 2022), performed by all members born in 2002 (Kanemura, Nao Kosaka, and Hiyori Hamagishi)
 "Sonota Ōzei Type" ("Tsuki to Hoshi ga Odoru Midnight" B-side, 2022), with Suzuka Tomita, Yūka Kageyama, and Hinano Kamimura

Filmography

Theatre

Television

Radio

Music video

Bibliography

References

External links 
  
  

2002 births
Living people
Actors from Saitama Prefecture
21st-century Japanese actresses
Hinatazaka46 members
Japanese idols
Japanese female models
Japanese film actresses
Musicians from Saitama Prefecture